Hahnenkamm is a Verwaltungsgemeinschaft (federation of municipalities) in the district of Weißenburg-Gunzenhausen in Bavaria in Germany. It consists of the following municipalities:
Gnotzheim 
Heidenheim
Westheim

Verwaltungsgemeinschaften in Bavaria
Weißenburg-Gunzenhausen